Aloe elgonica,  is a species of Aloe found in Mt. Elgon in Kenya.

References

External links
 
 

elgonica